The 1949–50 Syracuse Nationals season was the 1st season for the franchise in the National Basketball Association (NBA). The Nationals played their previous three seasons in the National Basketball League, which merged with the Basketball Association of America to form the NBA. Al Cervi, nicknamed "Digger" for his superior defensive skills, guided the team with his competitive nature while serving as a player-coach. As the Syracuse Post-Standard describes, "The Nationals shot poorly but succeeded because they played Cervi-style basketball: nasty, with an emphasis on defense." The Nationals went to the NBA Finals after beating the Philadelphia Warriors and New York Knicks, but lost to the Minneapolis Lakers in six games.

Draft picks

Roster
{| class="toccolours" style="font-size: 95%; "
|-
! colspan="2" style="background-color:#D0103A;  color:#FFFFFF; text-align: center;" | Syracuse Nationals 1949–50 roster
|- style="background-color:#0046AD; color:#FFFFFF;   text-align: center;"
! Players !! Coaches
|- 
| valign="top" |
{| class="sortable" style="background:transparent; margin:0px; width:100%;"
! Pos. !! # !! Nat. !! Name !! Ht. !! Wt. !! From

Regular season

Standings

Record vs. opponents

Game log

|- align="center" bgcolor="ccffcc"
| 1 || November 3 || Denver Nuggets || 78–58 || State Fair Coliseum || Al Cervi (17) || 1–0
|- align="center" bgcolor="ccffcc"
| 2 || November 5 || vs Denver Nuggets || 84–51 || (Auburn, New York) || Billy Gabor (12) || 2–0
|- align="center" bgcolor="ccffcc"
| 3 || November 6 || Philadelphia Warriors || 82–72 || State Fair Coliseum || Dolph Schayes (17) || 3–0
|- align="center" bgcolor="ccffcc"
| 4 || November 9 || Indianapolis Olympians || 103–73 || State Fair Coliseum || Dolph Schayes (22) || 4–0
|- align="center" bgcolor="ffcccc"
| 5 || November 10 || @ St. Louis Bombers || 67–73 || St. Louis Arena || Gabor, Hannum (13) || 4–1
|- align="center" bgcolor="ccffcc"
| 6 || November 12 || @ Anderson Packers || 84–69 || Anderson High School Wigwam || Al Cervi (23) || 5–1
|- align="center" bgcolor="ccffcc"
| 7 || November 13 || New York Knicks || 80–66 || State Fair Coliseum || Billy Gabor (20) || 6–1
|- align="center" bgcolor="ccffcc"
| 8 || November 15 || @ New York Knicks || 77–74 || Madison Square Garden III || Dolph Schayes (13) || 7–1
|- align="center" bgcolor="ccffcc"
| 9 || November 17 || Tri-Cities Blackhawks || 79–76 || State Fair Coliseum || Dolph Schayes (20) || 8–1
|- align="center" bgcolor="ccffcc"
| 10 || November 20 || Denver Nuggets || 102–76 || State Fair Coliseum || Billy Gabor (22) || 9–1
|- align="center" bgcolor="ccffcc"
| 11 || November 21 || vs Denver Nuggets || 77–67 || (Oneida, New York) || Andrew Levane (20) || 10–1
|- align="center" bgcolor="ccffcc"
| 12 || November 24 || Anderson Packers || 125–123 (5OT) || State Fair Coliseum || Johnny Macknowski (21) || 11–1
|- align="center" bgcolor="ccffcc"
| 13 || November 27 || Waterloo Hawks || 80–62 || State Fair Coliseum || Dolph Schayes (27) || 12–1
|- align="center" bgcolor="ccffcc"
| 14 || November 30 || @ Boston Celtics || 87–71 || Boston Garden || Billy Gabor (16) || 13–1
|-

|- align="center" bgcolor="ccffcc"
| 15 || December 4 || Indianapolis Olympians || 67–61 || State Fair Coliseum || Al Cervi (18) || 14–1
|- align="center" bgcolor="ccffcc"
| 16 || December 7 || @ Tri-Cities Blackhawks || 77–69 || Wharton Field House || Dolph Schayes (31) || 15–1
|- align="center" bgcolor="ccffcc"
| 17 || December 8 || @ Sheboygan Red Skins || 86–72 || Sheboygan Municipal Auditorium and Armory || Dolph Schayes (18) || 16–1
|- align="center" bgcolor="ffcccc"
| 18 || December 10 || @ Rochester Royals || 63–69 || Edgerton Park Arena || Peterson, Schayes (15) || 16–2
|- align="center" bgcolor="ccffcc"
| 19 || December 11 || Sheboygan Red Skins || 89–72 || State Fair Coliseum || Dolph Schayes (23) || 17–2
|- align="center" bgcolor="ccffcc"
| 20 || December 14 || Fort Wayne Pistons || 96–83 || State Fair Coliseum || Dolph Schayes (29) || 18–2
|- align="center" bgcolor="ffcccc"
| 21 || December 15 || @ Anderson Packers || 88–100 || Anderson High School Wigwam || Al Cervi (17) || 18–3
|- align="center" bgcolor="ccffcc"
| 22 || December 18 || Chicago Stags || 86–73 || State Fair Coliseum || Dolph Schayes (23) || 19–3
|- align="center" bgcolor="ccffcc"
| 23 || December 20 || @ Waterloo Hawks || 95–70 || McElroy Auditorium || Ratkovicz, Schayes (14) || 20–3
|- align="center" bgcolor="ccffcc"
| 24 || December 21 || @ Tri-Cities Blackhawks || 96–84 || Wharton Field House || Billy Gabor (23) || 21–3
|- align="center" bgcolor="ccffcc"
| 25 || December 22 || @ Sheboygan Red Skins || 83–74 || Sheboygan Municipal Auditorium and Armory || Alex Hannum (17) || 22–3
|- align="center" bgcolor="ccffcc"
| 26 || December 25 || Anderson Packers || 94–88 || State Fair Coliseum || Paul Seymour (24) || 23–3
|- align="center" bgcolor="ffcccc"
| 27 || December 28 || @ Washington Capitols || 85–87 || Uline Arena || Billy Gabor (23) || 23–4
|- align="center" bgcolor="ccffcc"
| 28 || December 29 || vs Philadelphia Warriors || 64–62 || (Atlantic City, New Jersey) || Dolph Schayes (18) || 24–4
|-

|- align="center" bgcolor="ccffcc"
| 29 || January 1 || Washington Capitols || 79–73 || State Fair Coliseum || Billy Gabor (20) || 25–4
|- align="center" bgcolor="ccffcc"
| 30 || January 5 || Tri-Cities Blackhawks || 82–73 || State Fair Coliseum || Al Cervi (18) || 26–4
|- align="center" bgcolor="ccffcc"
| 31 || January 8 || Waterloo Hawks || 84–68 || State Fair Coliseum || Billy Gabor (19) || 27–4
|- align="center" bgcolor="ffcccc"
| 32 || January 10 || @ Waterloo Hawks || 84–86 (OT) || McElroy Auditorium || Paul Seymour (14) || 27–5 
|- align="center" bgcolor="ffcccc"
| 33 || January 11 || @ Minneapolis Lakers || 88–98 || Minneapolis Auditorium || Al Cervi (19) || 27–6 
|- align="center" bgcolor="ccffcc"
| 34 || January 12 || @ Fort Wayne Pistons || 64–62 || North Side High School Gym || Al Cervi (17) || 28–6
|- align="center" bgcolor="ccffcc"
| 35 || January 15 || Indianapolis Olympians || 82–69 || State Fair Coliseum || Dolph Schayes (23) || 29–6
|- align="center" bgcolor="ccffcc"
| 36 || January 19 || Denver Nuggets || 107–86 || State Fair Coliseum || Johnny Macknowski (19) || 30–6
|- align="center" bgcolor="ffcccc"
| 37 || January 22 || Anderson Packers || 75–77 (OT) || State Fair Coliseum || George Ratkovicz (15) || 30–7 
|- align="center" bgcolor="ccffcc"
| 38 || January 26 || Rochester Royals || 76–72 || State Fair Coliseum || Billy Gabor (20) || 31–7 
|- align="center" bgcolor="ccffcc"
| 39 || January 29 || Sheboygan Red Skins || 85–70 || State Fair Coliseum || Dolph Schayes (21) || 32–7 
|- align="center" bgcolor="ccffcc"
| 40 || January 30 || vs Indianapolis Olympians || 91–75 || (Louisville, Kentucky) || Dolph Schayes (24) || 33–7 
|-

|- align="center" bgcolor="ffcccc"
| 41 || February 1 || @ Tri-Cities Blackhawks || 83–91 || Wharton Field House || Dolph Schayes (25) || 33–8 
|- align="center" bgcolor="ccffcc"
| 42 || February 2 || @ Indianapolis Olympians || 73–67 || Butler Fieldhouse || George Ratkovicz (16) || 34–8
|- align="center" bgcolor="ccffcc"
| 43 || February 3 || Waterloo Hawks || 103–79 || State Fair Coliseum || Billy Gabor (32) || 35–8
|- align="center" bgcolor="ccffcc"
| 44 || February 5 || Baltimore Bullets || 96–87 || State Fair Coliseum || Johnny Macknowski (22) || 36–8
|- align="center" bgcolor="ccffcc"
| 45 || February 8 || Sheboygan Red Skins || 106–81 || State Fair Coliseum || Billy Gabor (19) || 37–8
|- align="center" bgcolor="ccffcc"
| 46 || February 11 || @ Baltimore Bullets || 77–76 || Baltimore Coliseum || Al Cervi (18) || 38–8
|- align="center" bgcolor="ccffcc"
| 47 || February 12 || Waterloo Hawks || 102–98 || State Fair Coliseum || Andrew Levane (21) || 39–8 
|- align="center" bgcolor="ccffcc"
| 48 || February 16 || Tri-Cities Blackhawks || 105–74 || State Fair Coliseum || Dolph Schayes (17) || 40–8 
|- align="center" bgcolor="ccffcc"
| 49 || February 19 || Indianapolis Olympians || 82–78 || State Fair Coliseum || Dolph Schayes (29) || 41–8 
|- align="center" bgcolor="ffcccc"
| 50 || February 21 || @ Denver Nuggets || 78–89 || Denver Auditorium Arena || Dolph Schayes (31) || 41–9 
|- align="center" bgcolor="ccffcc"
| 51 || February 23 || @ Denver Nuggets || 108–80 || Denver Auditorium Arena || Dolph Schayes (25) || 42–9 
|- align="center" bgcolor="ccffcc"
| 52 || February 24 || vs Indianapolis Olympians || 72–67 || (Chicago) || George Ratkovicz (19) || 43–9 
|- align="center" bgcolor="ccffcc"
| 53 || February 26 || Chicago Stags || 73–64 || State Fair Coliseum || Dolph Schayes (24) || 44–9 
|- align="center" bgcolor="ffcccc"
| 54 || February 27 || @ Anderson Packers || 73–97 || Anderson High School Wigwam || Dolph Schayes (17) || 44–10 
|- align="center" bgcolor="ffcccc"
| 55 || February 28 || @ Indianapolis Olympians || 72–110 || Butler Fieldhouse || Alex Hannum (13) || 44–11 
|-

|- align="center" bgcolor="ccffcc"
| 56 || March 1 || @ Waterloo Hawks || 93–72 || McElroy Auditorium || Dolph Schayes (24) || 45–11
|- align="center" bgcolor="ffcccc"
| 57 || March 2 || @ Sheboygan Red Skins || 85–95 || Sheboygan Municipal Auditorium and Armory || Dolph Schayes (26) || 45–12 
|- align="center" bgcolor="ccffcc"
| 58 || March 5 || Minneapolis Lakers || 84–75 || State Fair Coliseum || Dolph Schayes (28) || 46–12 
|- align="center" bgcolor="ccffcc"
| 59 || March 9 || St. Louis Bombers || 85–74 || State Fair Coliseum || Dolph Schayes (19) || 47–12 
|- align="center" bgcolor="ccffcc"
| 60 || March 12 || Boston Celtics || 96–72 || State Fair Coliseum || Dolph Schayes (21) || 48–12 
|- align="center" bgcolor="ffcccc"
| 61 || March 14 || @ Indianapolis Olympians || 65–68 || Butler Fieldhouse || George Ratkovicz (20) || 48–13 
|- align="center" bgcolor="ccffcc"
| 62 || March 16 || @ Sheboygan Red Skins || 88–75 || Sheboygan Municipal Auditorium and Armory || Dolph Schayes (18) || 49–13 
|- align="center" bgcolor="ccffcc"
| 63 || March 18 || @ Tri-Cities Blackhawks || 89–88 (OT) || Wharton Field House || Johnny Macknowski (25) || 50–13 
|- align="center" bgcolor="ccffcc"
| 64 || March 19 || Anderson Packers || 72–67 || State Fair Coliseum || Dolph Schayes (20) || 51–13 
|-

|-
| 1949–50 Schedule

Playoffs

|- align="center" bgcolor="#ccffcc" 
| 1
| March 22
| Philadelphia
| W 93–76
| George Ratkovicz (25)
| Dolph Schayes (6)
| State Fair Coliseum
| 1–0
|- align="center" bgcolor="#ccffcc" 
| 2
| March 23
| @ Philadelphia
| W 59–53
| Dolph Schayes (16)
| Al Cervi (2)
| Philadelphia Arena
| 2–0
|-

|- align="center" bgcolor="#ccffcc" 
| 1
| March 26
| New York
| W 91–83 (OT)
| Dolph Schayes (26)
| Andrew Levane (4)
| State Fair Coliseum
| 1–0
|- align="center" bgcolor="#ffcccc" 
| 2
| March 30
| @ New York
| L 76–80
| George Ratkovicz (17)
| Al Cervi (4)
| Madison Square Garden III
| 1–1
|- align="center" bgcolor="#ccffcc" 
| 3
| April 2
| New York
| W 91–80
| Dolph Schayes (24)
| Schayes, Cervi (3)
| State Fair Coliseum
| 2–1
|-

|- align="center" bgcolor="#ffcccc" 
| 1
| April 8
| Minneapolis
| L 66–68
| Dolph Schayes (19)
| —
| State Fair Coliseum7,552
| 0–1
|- align="center" bgcolor="#ccffcc" 
| 2
| April 9
| Minneapolis
| W 91–85
| George Ratkovicz (17)
| —
| State Fair Coliseum8,280
| 1–1
|- align="center" bgcolor="#ffcccc" 
| 3
| April 14
| @ Minneapolis
| L 77–91
| Johnny Macknowski (25)
| Paul Seymour (5)
| St. Paul Auditorium10,288
| 1–2
|- align="center" bgcolor="#ffcccc" 
| 4
| April 16
| @ Minneapolis
| L 69–77
| Schayes, Hannum (18)
| Bill Gabor (6)
| St. Paul Auditorium10,512
| 1–3
|- align="center" bgcolor="#ccffcc" 
| 5
| April 20
| Minneapolis
| W 83–76
| Dolph Schayes (19)
| —
| State Fair Coliseum9,024
| 2–3
|- align="center" bgcolor="#ffcccc" 
| 6
| April 23
| @ Minneapolis
| L 95–110
| Dolph Schayes (23)
| Johnny Macknowski (5)
| Minneapolis Auditorium9,812
| 2–4
|-

 Nationals had a bye in the NBA Semifinals as the team with the best record amongst teams who advanced past the Division Finals.

Awards and records
Al Cervi, All-NBA Second Team
Dolph Schayes, All-NBA Second Team

References

Philadelphia 76ers seasons
Syracuse